The Nasserist Reform Organisation (Tanzim at-Tashikh ash-Shabi an-Nasiri) is a political party in Yemen. It is led by Mujahed al-Quhali.

History
The party was established in 1991 as a merger of the Democratic United Corrective Front and the Nasserite Organisation of Yemen. Despite having an estimated membership of around 100,000, it received only 6,170 votes in the 1993 elections, winning one seat in the House of Representatives. However, the 1997 elections saw its vote share drop from 0.3% to 0.1%, and it lost its parliamentary representation. Despite a small increase in its vote share, it remained seatless following the 2003 elections.

References

Political parties in Yemen
1991 establishments in Yemen
Arab nationalism in Yemen
Nasserist political parties
Political parties established in 1991
Socialist parties in Yemen